A-line or A Line may refer to:

Transport 
 A (New York City Subway service), rapid transit line
 A Line (Los Angeles Metro), a light rail line in Los Angeles County, California
 A Line (RTD), commuter rail line between Denver and Aurora, Colorado
 Atlantic Coast Line Railroad, rail line in Florida
 A Line (Minnesota), a bus rapid transit line in Minneapolis, Saint Paul, and Roseville, Minnesota
 A-Line (Hamilton), planned rapid transit line in Hamilton, Ontario, Canada
 RapidRide A Line, bus route in King County, Washington
 Line A (Buenos Aires Underground), Argentina
 RER A, commuter rail line in Paris, France
 A (Los Angeles Railway), former streetcar service

Other uses 
 A-line (clothing), a style of skirt or dress
 Arterial line, a thin catheter inserted into an artery
 A-line - a finding in medical ultrasound of the lung

See also 
 A-A line
 Aline (disambiguation)
 Line A (disambiguation)
 Line (disambiguation)